"Ain't No Future in Yo' Frontin'" is a song performed by American hip hop group MC Breed and DFC from Flint, Michigan. It was released in 1991 through S.D.E.G. Records with distribution via Ichiban Records, as a lead single from the trio's debut studio album MC Breed & DFC. It was written, arranged and produced by MC Breed, Herman Lang, Pierre Ushay and S. Harris.

The song was later included in MC Breed's 1995 greatest hits album The Best of Breed, and was featured in the soundtrack to the 1998 film Ringmaster. It was covered by Erick Sermon retitled "Ain't No Future...2001" from his 2001 album Music, by Johnny Richter for Subnoize Souljaz's 2009 album Blast From tha Past, and by Insane Clown Posse for their 2012 album Smothered, Covered & Chunked.

Track listing

Personnel 

 Eric Tyrone Breed – performer, arranger, producer
 Herman Lang, Jr. – arranger, producer, re-mixing
 Schzelle Salomon Harris – arranger, producer
 Bernard Terry – re-mixing
 Pierre Ushay - producer, re-mixing

Charts 
The single peaked at number 66 on the Billboard Hot 100, at number 47 on the Hot R&B/Hip-Hop Songs and at number 12 on the Hot Rap Songs in the United States, making it the most successful single for both MC Breed and DFC.

References

External links 

 

1991 debut singles
American hip hop songs
1991 songs